"Cross Your Fingers" is a single by Laura Marling. It was released on June 8, 2008 as the second single from her debut album Alas, I Cannot Swim. The song peaked to number 113 on the UK Singles Chart.

Music video
A music video to accompany the release of "Cross Your Fingers" was first released onto YouTube on 28 February 2009. The video includes both "Cross Your Fingers" and "Interlude (Crawled Out of the Sea)", which the former track segues into on Alas, I Cannot Swim

Track listing

Chart performance

Release history

References

2008 singles
Laura Marling songs
2008 songs
Virgin Records singles